Latin is a member of the broad family of Italic languages. Its alphabet, the Latin alphabet, emerged from the Old Italic alphabets, which in turn were derived from the Etruscan, Greek and Phoenician scripts. Historical Latin came from the prehistoric language of the Latium region, specifically around the River Tiber, where Roman civilization first developed. How and when Latin came to be spoken by the Romans are questions that have long been debated.

Various influences on Latin of Celtic dialects in northern Italy, the non-Indo-European Etruscan language in Central Italy, and the Greek in some Greek colonies of southern Italy have been detected, but when these influences entered the native Latin is not known for certain.

Surviving Latin literature consists almost entirely of Classical Latin in its broadest definition. It includes a polished and sometimes highly stylized literary language sometimes termed Golden Latin, which spans the 1st century BC and the early years of the 1st century AD. However, throughout the history of ancient Rome the spoken language differed in both grammar and vocabulary from that of literature, and is referred to as Vulgar Latin. 

In addition to Latin, the Greek language was often spoken by the well-educated elite, who studied it in school and acquired Greek tutors from among the influx of enslaved educated Greek prisoners of war, captured during the Roman conquest of Greece. In the eastern half of the Roman Empire, later referred to as the Byzantine Empire, the Greek Koine of Hellenism remained current among peasants and traders, while Latin was used for laws and administrative writings. It continued to influence the Vulgar Latin that would evolve into the Eastern Romance languages.

Origins

The name Latin derives from the Italic tribal group named Latini that settled around the 10th century BC in Latium, and the dialect spoken by these people.

The Italic languages form a centum subfamily of the Indo-European language family, which include the Germanic, Celtic, and Hellenic languages, and a number of extinct ones.

Broadly speaking, in initial syllables the Indo-European simple vowels—*i, *e, (*a), *o, *u; short and long—are usually retained in Latin. The vocalized laryngeals (*ə) appear in Latin as a (cf. IE *pəter > L pater). Diphthongs are also preserved in Old Latin, but in Classical Latin some tend to become monophthongs (for example oi > ū or oe, and ei > ē > ī). In non-initial syllables, there was more vowel reduction. The most extreme case occurs with short vowels in medial open syllables (i.e. short vowels followed by at most a single consonant, occurring neither in the first nor last syllable): All are reduced to a single vowel, which appears as i in most cases, but e (sometimes o) before r, and u before an l which is followed by o or u. In final syllables, short e and o are usually raised to i and u, respectively.

Consonants are generally more stable. However, the Indo-European voiced aspirates bh, dh, gh, gwh are not maintained, becoming f, f, h, f respectively at the beginning of a word, but usually b, d, g, v elsewhere. Non-initial dh becomes b next to r or u, e.g. *h₁rudh- "red" > rub-, e.g. rubeō "to be red"; *werdh- "word" > verbum. s between vowels becomes r, e.g. flōs "flower", gen. flōris; erō "I will be" vs. root es-; aurōra "dawn" < *ausōsā (cf. Germanic *aust- > English "east", Vedic Sanskrit uṣā́s "dawn"); soror "sister" < *sozor < *swezōr < *swésōr (cf. Old English sweostor "sister").

Of the original eight cases of Proto-Indo-European, Latin inherited six: nominative, vocative, accusative, genitive, dative, and ablative. The Indo-European locative survived in the declensions of some place names and a few common nouns, such as Roma "Rome" (locative Romae) and domus "home" (locative domī "at home"). Vestiges of the instrumental case may remain in adverbial forms ending in -ē.

It is believed that the earliest surviving inscription is a seventh-century BC fibula known as the Praenestine fibula, which reads Manios med fhefhaked Numasioi "Manius made me for Numerius".

Ages of Latin

Old Latin

Old Latin (also called Early Latin or Archaic Latin) refers to the period of Latin texts before the age of Classical Latin, extending from textual fragments that probably originated in the Roman monarchy to the written language of the late Roman republic about 75 BC. Almost all the writing of its earlier phases is inscriptional.

Some phonological characteristics of older Latin are the case endings -os and -om (later Latin -us and -um). In many locations, classical Latin turned intervocalic /s/ into /r/. This had implications for declension: early classical Latin, honos, honosis; Classical honor, honoris ("honor"). Some Latin texts preserve /s/ in this position, such as the Carmen Arvales lases for lares.

Classical LatinClassical Latin is the form of the Latin language used by the ancient Romans in Classical Latin literature. In the latest and narrowest philological model its use spanned the Golden Age of Latin literature—broadly the 1st century BC and the early 1st century AD—possibly extending to the Silver Age—broadly the 1st and 2nd centuries. It was a polished written literary language based on the refined spoken language of the upper classes. Classical Latin differs from Old Latin: the earliest inscriptional language and the earliest authors, such as Ennius, Plautus and others, in a number of ways; for example, the early -om and -os endings shifted into -um and -us ones, and some lexical differences also developed, such as the broadening of the meaning of words. In the broadest and most ancient sense, the classical period includes the authors of Early Latin, the Golden Age and the Silver Age.

Golden Age
The Golden age of Latin literature is a period consisting roughly of the time from 75 BC to AD 14, covering the end of the Roman Republic and the reign of Augustus Caesar. In the currently used philological model this period represents the peak of Latin literature. Since the earliest post-classical times the Latin of those authors has been an ideal norm of the best Latin, which other writers should follow.

Silver Age
In reference to Roman literature, the Silver age covers the first two centuries AD directly after the Golden age. Literature from the Silver Age is more embellished with mannerisms.

Late LatinLate Latin is the administrative and literary language of Late Antiquity in the late Roman empire and states that succeeded the Western Roman Empire over the same range. By its broadest definition it is dated from about 200 AD to about 900 AD when it was replaced by written Romance languages. Opinion concerning whether it should be considered classical is divided. The authors of the period looked back to a classical period they believed should be imitated and yet their styles were often classical. According to the narrowest definitions, Late Latin did not exist and the authors of the times are to be considered medieval.

Vulgar LatinVulgar Latin (in Latin, sermo vulgaris) is a blanket term covering vernacular dialects of the Latin language spoken from earliest times in Italy until the latest dialects of the Western Roman Empire, diverging still further, evolved into the early Romance languages—whose writings began to appear about the 9th century.

This spoken Latin differed from the literary language of Classical Latin in its grammar and vocabulary. It is likely to have evolved over time, with some features not appearing until the late Empire. Other features are likely to have been in place much earlier. Because there are few phonetic transcriptions of the daily speech of these Latin speakers (to match, for example, the post-classical Appendix Probi) Vulgar Latin must be studied mainly by indirect methods.

Knowledge of Vulgar Latin comes from a variety of sources. First, the comparative method reconstructs items of the mother language from the attested Romance languages. Also, prescriptive grammar texts from the Late Latin period condemn some usages as errors, providing insight into how Latin was actually spoken. The solecisms and non-Classical usages occasionally found in Late Latin texts also shed light on the spoken language. A windfall source lies in the chance finds of wax tablets such as those found at Vindolanda on Hadrian's Wall. The Roman cursive script was used on these tablets.

Romance languages

The Romance languages, a major branch of the Indo-European language family, comprise all languages that descended from Latin, the language of the Roman Empire. The Romance languages have more than 700 million native speakers worldwide, mainly in the Americas, Europe, and Africa, as well as in many smaller regions scattered through the world.

All Romance languages descend from Vulgar Latin, the language of soldiers, settlers, and slaves of the Roman Empire, which was substantially different from that of the Roman literati. Between 200 BC and AD 100, the expansion of the Empire and the administrative and educational policies of Rome made Vulgar Latin the dominant vernacular language over a wide area which stretched from the Iberian Peninsula to the west coast of the Black Sea. During the Empire's decline and after its collapse and fragmentation in the 5th century, Vulgar Latin began to evolve independently within each local area, and eventually diverged into dozens of distinct languages. The overseas empires established by Spain, Portugal and France after the 15th century then spread these languages to other continents—about two thirds of all Romance speakers are now outside Europe.

In spite of the multiple influences of pre-Roman languages and later invasions, the phonology, morphology, lexicon, and syntax of all Romance languages are predominantly derived from Vulgar Latin. As a result, the group shares a number of linguistic features that set it apart from other Indo-European branches.

Ecclesiastical LatinEcclesiastical Latin (sometimes called Church Latin) is a broad and analogous term referring to the Latin language as used in documents of the Roman Catholic Church, its liturgies (mainly in past times) and during some periods the preaching of its ministers. Ecclesiastical Latin is not a single style: the term merely means the language promulgated at any time by the church. In terms of stylistic periods, it belongs to Late Latin in the Late Latin period, Medieval Latin in the Medieval Period, and so on through to the present. One may say that, starting from the church's decision in the early Late Latin period to use a simple and unornamented language that would be comprehensible to ordinary Latin speakers and yet still be elegant and correct, church Latin is usually a discernible substyle within the major style of the period. Its authors in the New Latin period are typically paradigmatic of the best Latin and that is true in contemporary times. The decline in its use within the last 100 years has been a matter of regret to some, who have formed organizations inside and outside the church to support its use and to use it.

Medieval LatinMedieval Latin, the literary and administrative Latin used in the Middle Ages, exhibits much variation between individual authors, mainly due to poor communications in those times between different regions. The individuality is characterised by a different range of solecisms and by the borrowing of different words from Vulgar Latin or from local vernaculars. Some styles show features intermediate between Latin and Romance languages; others are closer to classical Latin. The stylistic variations came to an end with the rise of nation states and new empires in the Renaissance period, and the authority of early universities imposing a new style: Renaissance Latin.

Renaissance LatinRenaissance Latin is a name given to the Latin written during the European Renaissance in the 14th-16th centuries, particularly distinguished by the distinctive Latin style developed by the humanist movement.

Ad fontes was the general cry of the humanists, and as such their Latin style sought to purge Latin of the medieval Latin vocabulary and stylistic accretions that it had acquired in the centuries after the fall of the Roman Empire. They looked to Golden Age Latin literature, and especially to Cicero in prose and Virgil in poetry, as the arbiters of Latin style. They abandoned the use of the sequence and other accentual forms of meter, and sought instead to revive the Greek formats that were used in Latin poetry during the Roman period. The humanists condemned the large body of medieval Latin literature as "gothic"—for them, a term of abuse—and believed instead that only ancient Latin from the Roman period was "real Latin".

The humanists also sought to purge written Latin of medieval developments in its orthography. They insisted, for example, that ae be written out in full wherever it occurred in classical Latin; medieval scribes often wrote e instead of ae. They were much more zealous than medieval Latin writers in distinguishing t from c: because the effects of palatalization made them homophones, medieval scribes often wrote, for example, eciam for etiam. Their reforms even affected handwriting: humanists usually wrote Latin in a script derived from Carolingian minuscule, the ultimate ancestor of most contemporary lower-case typefaces, avoiding the black-letter scripts used in the Middle Ages. Erasmus even proposed that the then-traditional pronunciations of Latin be abolished in favour of his reconstructed version of classical Latin pronunciation.

The humanist plan to remake Latin was largely successful, at least in education. Schools now taught the humanistic spellings, and encouraged the study of the texts selected by the humanists, largely to the exclusion of later Latin literature. On the other hand, while humanist Latin was an elegant literary language, it became much harder to write books about law, medicine, science or contemporary politics in Latin while observing all of the humanists' norms of vocabulary purging and classical usage. Because humanist Latin lacked precise vocabulary to deal with modern issues, their reforms accelerated the transformation of Latin from a working language to an object of antiquarian study. Their attempts at literary work, especially poetry, often have a strong element of pastiche.

New Latin

After the medieval era, Latin was revived in original, scholarly, and scientific works between  1375 and  1900. The result language is called New Latin. Modern scholarly and technical nomenclature, such as in zoological and botanical taxonomy and international scientific vocabulary, draws extensively from New Latin vocabulary.  In such use, New Latin is subject to new word formation. As a language for full expression in prose or poetry, however, it is often distinguished from its successor, Contemporary Latin.

Classicists use the term "Neo-Latin" to describe the use of Latin after the Renaissance as a result of renewed interest in classical civilization in the 14th and 15th centuries.

Contemporary Latin

Contemporary Latin is the form of the Latin language used since the end of the 19th century. Various kinds of contemporary Latin can be distinguished, including the use of single words in taxonomy, and the fuller ecclesiastical use in the Catholic Church. 

As a relic of the great importance of New Latin as the formerly dominant international lingua franca down to the 19th century in a great number of fields, Latin is still present in words or phrases used in many languages around the world, and some minor communities use Latin in their speech.

Phonological changes

Vowels
Proto-Italic inherited all ten of the early post-Proto-Indo-European simple vowels (i.e. at a time when laryngeals had colored and often lengthened adjacent vowels and then disappeared in many circumstances): *i, *e, *a, *o, *u, *ī, *ē, *ā, *ō, *ū. It also inherited all of the post-PIE diphthongs except for *eu, which became *ou.

Proto-Italic and Old Latin had a stress accent on the first syllable of a word, and this caused steady reduction and eventual deletion of many short vowels in non-initial syllables while affecting initial syllables much less. Long vowels were largely unaffected in general except in final syllables, where they had a tendency to shorten.

Notes:

Note: For the following examples, it helps to keep in mind the normal correspondences between PIE and certain other languages:

Monophthongs

Initial syllables
In initial syllables, Latin generally preserves all of the simple vowels of Proto-Italic (see above):
PIE *ǵneh₃tós "known" > *gnōtos > nōtus (i-gnōtus "unknown"; Welsh gnawd "customary", Sanskrit jñātá-; Greek gnōtós)})
PIE *gʷih₃wós "alive" > *gʷīwos > vīvus (Old English cwic, English quick, Greek bíos "life", Sanskrit jīvá-, Slavic živъ)
PIE *h₂eǵros "field" > *agros > ager, gen. agrī (Greek agrós, English acre, Sanskrit ájra-)
PIE *kápros "he-goat" > *kapros > caper "he-goat", gen. caprī (Greek kápros "boar", Old English hæfer "he-goat", Sanskrit kápṛth "penis")
PIE *kʷís "who?" > *kʷis > quis (Greek tís, Avestan čiš, Sanskrit kís)
PIE *kʷód "what, that" > *kʷod > quod (relative) (Old English hwæt "what", Sanskrit kád)
PIE *méh₂tēr "mother" > *mātēr > māter (Doric Greek mā́tēr, Old Irish máthir, Sanskrit mā́tṛ)
PIE *múh₂s "mouse" > *mūs > mūs (Old English mūs, Greek mûs, Sanskrit mū́ṣ)
PIE *nókʷts "night" > *noks > nox, gen. noctis (Greek nuks < *nokʷs, Sanskrit nákt- < *nákts, Lithuanian naktìs)
PIE *oḱtṓ "eight" > *oktō > octō (Greek oktṓ, Irish ocht, Sanskrit aṣṭā́)
PIE *sēmi- "half" > *sēmi- > sēmi- (Greek hēmi-, Old English sām-, Sanskrit sāmí)
PIE *sweh₂dús "pleasing, tasty" > *swādus > *swādwis (remade into i-stem) > suāvis (Doric Greek hādús, English sweet, Sanskrit svādú-)
PIE *swéḱs "six", septḿ̥ "seven" > *seks, *septem > sex, septem (Greek heks, heptá, Lithuanian šešì, septynì, Sanskrit ṣáṣ, saptá-)
PIE *yugóm "yoke" > *jugom > iugum (Greek zugón, Gothic juk, Sanskrit yugá-)

Short vowel changes in initial syllables:
 *e > i before  (spelled n before a velar, or g before n):
PIE *deḱnós > *degnos > dignus "worthy"
PIE *dn̥ǵʰwéh₂s > *denɣwā > Old Latin dingua > lingua "tongue" (l- from lingō "to lick")
 *swe- > so-:
*swepnos > *sopnos > somnus "sleep"
*swezōr > *sozor > soror, gen. sorōris "sister"
 *we- > wo- before labial consonants or velarized l [ɫ] (l pinguis; i.e. an l not followed by i, ī or l):
*welō "I want" > volō (vs. velle "to want" before l exīlis)
*wemō "I vomit" > vomō (Greek eméō, Sanskrit vámiti)

There are numerous examples where PIE *o appears to result in Latin a instead of expected o, mostly next to labial or labializing consonants. A group of cases showing *-ow- > *-aw- > -av- (before stress), *-ōw- > *-āw- > -āv- is known as Thurneysen-Havet's law: examples include:
PIE *lowh₃ṓ > *lawō > lavō 'I wash'
PIE *oḱtṓwos > *oktāwos > octāvus 'eighth' (but octō 'eight')

Other cases remain more disputed, such as:
 lacus 'lake', in contrast to Irish loch < PIE *lókus
 mare 'sea', in contrast to Irish muir, Welsh môr (Proto-Celtic *mori) < PIE *móri

De Vaan (2008: 8) suggests a general shift *o > a in open syllables when preceded by any of *b, *m; *kʷ, *w; *l. Vine (2011) disputes the cases with *moCV, but proposes inversely that *mo- > ma- when followed by r plus a velar (k or g).

Medial syllables
In non-initial syllables, there was more vowel reduction of short vowels. The most extreme case occurs with short vowels in medial syllables (i.e. short vowels in a syllable that is neither the first nor the last), where all five vowels usually merge into a single vowel:

1. They merge into e before r (sometimes original o is unaffected)
*en-armis > inermis "unarmed" (vs. arma "arms")
*Falisiōi > Faleriī "Falerii (major town of the Faliscans)" (vs. Faliscus "Faliscan")
*-foro- "carrying" (cf. Greek -phóros) > -fero-, e.g. furcifer "gallows bird"
*kinis-es "ash" (gen.sg.) > cineris (vs. nom.sg. cinis)
*kom-gesō > congerō "to collect" (vs. gerō "to do, carry out")
Latin-Faliscan Numasiōi (Praeneste fibula) > Numeriō "Numerius"
Latin-Faliscan *pe-par-ai "I gave birth" > peperī (vs. pariō "I give birth")
PIE *swéḱuros "father-in-law" > *swekuros > Old Latin *soceros > socer, gen. socerī

2. They become Old Latin o > u before l pinguis, i.e., an l not followed by i, ī, or l:
*ad-alēskō "to grow up" > adolēscō > adulēscō (vs. alō "I nourish")
*en-saltō "to leap upon" > īnsoltō (with lengthening before ns) > īnsultō (vs. saltō "I leap")
PIE *-kl̥d-to- "beaten" > *-kolsso- > perculsus "beaten down"
*kom-solō "deliberate" > cōnsulō
*ob-kelō "to conceal" > occulō (vs. celō "I hide")
Greek Sikelós "a Sicilian" > *Sikolos > Siculus (vs. Sicilia "Sicily")
*te-tol-ai > tetulī "I carried" (formerly l pinguis here because of the original final -ai)

3. But they remain o before l pinguis when immediately following a vowel:
Latin-Faliscan *fili-olos > filiolus "little son"
Similarly, alveolus "trough"

4. Before /w/ the result is always u, in which case the /w/ is not written:
*dē nowōd "anew" > dēnuō
*eks-lawō "I wash away" > ēluō
*mon-i-wai "I warned" > monuī
*tris-diw-om "period of three days" > trīduom > trīduum

5. They become i before one consonant other than r or l pinguis:
*ad-tenējō > attineō "to concern" (vs. teneō "I hold")
*kaput-es "head" (gen. sg.) > capitis (vs. nom.sg. caput)
Latin-Faliscan *ke-kad-ai "I fell" > cecidī (vs. cadō "I fall")
*kom-itājō "accompany" > comitō
*kom-regō > corrigō "to set right, correct" (vs. regō "I rule; straighten")
*kornu-kan- "trumpeter" > cornicen
PIE *me-món-h₂e (perfect) "thought, pondered" > Latin-Faliscan *me-mon-ai > meminī "I remember"
*nowotāts "newness" > novitās
Greek Sikelía "Sicily" > Sicilia (vs. Siculus "a Sicilian")
*wre-fakjō "to remake" > *refakiō > reficiō (vs. faciō "I do, make")

6. But they sometimes become e before one consonant other than r or l pinguis, when immediately following a vowel:
*sokiotāts "fellowship" > societās
*wariogājesi "to make diverse" > variegāre
But: *medio-diēs "midday" > *meriodiēs (dissimilative rhotacism) > *meriidiēs > merīdiēs "noon; south"
But: *tībia-kan- "flute-player" > *tībiikan- > tībīcen

7. Variation between i and (often earlier) u is common before a single labial consonant (p, b, f, m), underlyingly the sonus medius vowel:
From the root *-kap- "grab, catch":
occupō "seize" vs. occipiō "begin"
From the related noun *-kaps "catcher": prīnceps "chief" (lit. "seizer of the first (position)"), gen. prīncipis, vs. auceps "bird catcher", gen. aucupis
*man-kapiom > mancupium "purchase", later mancipium
*mag-is-emos > maxumus "biggest", later maximus; similarly proxumus "nearest", optumus "best" vs. later proximus, optimus
*pot-s-omos > possumus "we can"; *vel-omos > volumus "we want"; but *leg-omos > legimus "we gather", and all other such verbs (-umus is isolated in sumus, possumus and volumus)
*sub-rapuit > surrupuit "filches", later surripuit

Medially before two consonants, when the first is not r or l pinguis, the vowels do not merge to the same degree:

1. Original a, e and u merge into e:
*ad-tentos > attentus "concerned" (cf. tentus "held", attineō "to concern")
*sub-raptos "filched" > surreptus (vs. raptus "seized")
Greek tálanton > *talantom > talentum
*wre-faktos "remade" > refectus (cf. factus "made")

2. But original i is unaffected:
*wre-likʷtos "left (behind)" > relictus

3. And original o raises to u:
*ejontes "going" (gen. sg.) > euntis
*legontor "they gather" > leguntur
*rōbos-to- > rōbustus "oaken" (cf. rōbur "oak" < *rōbos)

SyncopeExon's Law dictates that if there are two light medial syllables in a row (schematically, σσ̆σ̆σ, where σ = syllable and σ̆ = light syllable, where "light" means a short vowel followed by only a single consonant), the first syllable syncopates (i.e. the vowel is deleted):
*deksiteros "right (hand)" > dexterus (cf. Greek deksiterós)
*magisemos > maximus "biggest" (cf. magis "more")
*priismo-kapes > prīncipis "prince" gen. sg. (nom. sg. prīnceps < *priismo-kaps by analogy)
*wre-peparai > repperī "I found" (cf. peperī "I gave birth" < *peparai)

Syncopation tends to occur after r and l in all non-initial syllables, sometimes even in initial syllables.
*agros "field" > *agr̩s > *agers > *agerr > ager
*faklitāts > facultās
*feret "he carries" > fert
*imbris "rainstorm" > *imbers > imber
*tris "three times" > *tr̩s > *ters > Old Latin terr > ter

Sometimes early syncope causes apparent violations of Exon's Law:
kosolinos "of hazel" > *kozolnos (not **koslinos) > *korolnos > *korulnos (o > u before l pinguis, see above) > colurnus (metathesis)

Syncope of -i- also occurred in -ndis, -ntis and -rtis. -nts then became -ns with lengthening of the preceding vowel, while -rts was simplified to -rs without lengthening.
 *frondis "leaf" > *fronts > frōns
 *gentis "tribe" > *gents > gēns
 *montis "hill" > *monts > mōns
 *partis "part" > *parts > pars

Final syllables
In final syllables of polysyllabic words before a final consonant or cluster, short a, e, i merge into either e or i depending on the following consonant, and short o, u merge into u.

1. Short a, e, i merge into i before a single non-nasal consonant:
PIE thematic 2nd/3rd sg. *-esi, *-eti > PI *-es, *-et > -is, -it (e.g. legis, legit "you gather, he gathers")
Proto-Italic *wrededas, *wrededat > reddis, reddit "you return, he returns"
i-stem nom. sg. *-is > -is

2. Short a, e, i merge into e before a cluster or a single nasal consonant:
*in-art-is > iners "unskilled" (cf. ars "skill")
*kornu-kan-(?s) > cornicen "trumpeter" (cf. canō "to sing")
*mīlets > mīles "soldier"
*priismo-kaps > prīnceps "first, chief" (cf. capiō "to take")
*septḿ̥ > septem "seven"
i-stem acc. sg. *-im > -em

3. Short o, u merge into u:
o-stem accusative *-om > Old Latin -om > -um
o-stem nominative *-os > Old Latin -os > -us
PIE thematic 3rd sg. mediopassive *-etor > -itur
PIE thematic 3rd pl. *-onti > *-ont > -unt
*kaput > caput "head"
PIE *yekʷr̥ > *jekʷor > iecur "liver"

4. All short vowels apparently merge into -e in absolute final position.
2nd sg. passive -ezo, -āzo > -ere, -āre
Proto-Italic *kʷenkʷe > quīnque "five"
PIE *móri > PI *mari > mare "sea" (cf. plural maria)
PI s-stem verbal nouns in *-zi > infinitives in -reBut:''' u-stem neuter nom./acc. sg. *-u > -ū, apparently by analogy with gen. sg. -ūs, dat./abl. sg. -ū (it is not known if this change occurred already in Proto-Italic)

Long vowels in final syllables shorten before most consonants (but not final s), yielding apparent exceptions to the above rules:
a-stem acc. sg. *-ām > -amProto-Italic *amānt > amant "they love"
Proto-Italic *amāt > amat "he/she loves" (cf. passive amātur)
PIE thematic 1st sg. mediopassive *-ōr > -or*swesōr > soror "sister" (cf. gen. sorōris)

Absolutely final long vowels are apparently maintained with the exception of ā, which is shortened in the 1st declension nominative singular and the neuter plural ending (both < PIE *-eh₂) but maintained in the 1st conjugation 2nd sg. imperative (< PIE *-eh₂-yé).

Diphthongs

Initial syllables
Proto-Italic maintained all PIE diphthongs except for the change *eu > *ou. The Proto-Italic diphthongs tend to remain into Old Latin but generally reduce to pure long vowels by Classical Latin.

1. PIE *ei > Old Latin ei > ẹ̄, a vowel higher than ē < PIE *ē. This then developed to ī normally, but to ē before v:
PIE *bʰeydʰ- "be persuaded, be confident" > *feiðe- > fīdō "to trust"
PIE *deiḱ- "point (out)" > Old Latin deicō > dīcō "to say"
PIE *deiwós "god, deity" > Very Old Latin deiuos (Duenos inscription) > dẹ̄vos > deus (cf. dīvus "divine, godlike, godly")
 But nominative plural *deivoi > *deivei > *dẹ̄vẹ̄ > dīvī > diī; vocative singular *deive > *dẹ̄ve > dīve2. PIE (*h₂ei >) *ai > ae:
PIE *kh₂ei-ko- > *kaiko- > caecus "blind" (cf. Old Irish cáech  "blind", Gothic háihs "one-eyed", Sanskrit kekara- "squinting")

3. PIE *oi > Old Latin oi, oe > ū (occasionally preserved as oe):
PIE *h₁oi-nos > Old Latin oinos > oenus > ūnus "one"
Greek Phoiniks > Pūnicus "Phoenician"
But: PIE *bʰoidʰ- > *foiðo- > foedus "treaty" (cf. fīdō above)

4. PIE *eu, *ou > Proto-Italic *ou > Old Latin ou > ọ̄ (higher than ō < PIE *ō) > ū:
PIE *deuk- > *douk-e- > Old Latin doucō > dūcō "lead"
PIE *louk-s-neh₂ > *louksnā > Old Latin losna (i.e. lọ̄sna) > lūna "moon" (cf. Old Prussian lauxnos "stars", Avestan raoχšnā "lantern")
PIE *(H)yeug- "join" > *youg-s-mn̥-to- > Old Latin iouxmentom "pack horse" > iūmentum5. PIE (*h₂eu >) *au > au:
PIE *h₂eug- > *augeje/o > augeō "to increase" (cf. Greek aúksō, Gothic áukan, Lithuanian áugti).

Medial syllables
All diphthongs in medial syllables become ī or ū.

1. (Post-)PIE *ei > ī, just as in initial syllables:*en-deik-ō > indīcō "to point out" (cf. dīcō "to say")

2. Post-PIE *ai > Old Latin ei > ī:*en-kaid-ō "cut into" > incīdō (cf. caedō "cut")*ke-kaid-ai "I cut", perf. > cecīdī (cf. caedō "I cut", pres.)
Early Greek (or from an earlier source) *elaíwā "olive" > olīva3. (Post-)PIE *oi > ū, just as in initial syllables:
PIE *n̥-poini "with impunity" > impūne (cf. poena "punishment")

4. (Post-)PIE *eu, *ou > Proto-Italic *ou > ū, just as in initial syllables:*en-deuk-ō > *indoucō > indūcō "to draw over, cover" (cf. dūcō "to lead")

5. Post-PIE *au > ū (rarely oe):*ad-kauss-ō "accuse" > accūsō (cf. causa "cause")*en-klaud-ō "enclose" > inclūdō (cf. claudō "close")*ob-aud-iō "obey" > oboediō (cf. audiō "hear").

Final syllables
Mostly like medial syllables:*-ei > ī: PIE *meh₂tr-ei "to mother" > mātrī*-ai > ī in multisyllabic words: Latin-Faliscan peparai "I brought forth" > peperī*-eu/ou- > ū: post-PIE manous "hand", gen. sg. > manūsDifferent from medial syllables:-ai > ae in monosyllables: PIE *prh₂ei "before" > prae (cf. Greek paraí)-oi > Old Latin -ei > ī (not ū): PIE o-stem plural *-oi > -ī (cf. Greek -oi);-oi > ī also in monosyllables: PIE kʷoi "who" > quī.

Syllabic resonants and laryngeals
The PIE syllabic resonants *m̥, *n̥, *r̥, *l̥ generally become em, en, or, ol (cf. Greek am/a, an/a, ar/ra, al/la; Germanic um, un, ur, ul; Sanskrit am/a, an/a, r̥, r̥; Lithuanian im̃, iñ, ir̃, il̃):
PIE *déḱm̥(t) "ten" > decem (cf. Irish deich, Greek deka, Gothic taíhun )
PIE *(d)ḱm̥tóm "hundred" > centum (cf. Welsh cant, Gothic hund, Lithuanian šim̃tas, Sanskrit śatám)
PIE *n̥- "not" > OL en- > in- (cf. Greek a-/an-, English un-, Sanskrit a-, an-)
PIE *tn̥tós "stretched" > tentus (cf. Greek tatós, Sanskrit tatá-)
PIE *ḱr̥d- "heart" > *cord > cor (cf. Greek kēr, English heart, Lithuanian širdìs, Sanskrit hṛd-)
PIE *ml̥dús "soft" > *moldus > *moldwis (remade as i-stem) > *molwis > mollis (cf. Irish meldach "pleasing", English mild, Czech mladý)

The laryngeals *h₁, *h₂, *h₃ appear in Latin as a when between consonants, as in most languages (but Greek e/a/o respectively, Sanskrit i):
PIE *dʰh₁-tós "put" > L factus, with /k/ of disputed etymology (cf. Greek thetós, Sanskrit hitá- < *dhitá-)
PIE *ph₂tḗr "father" > L pater (cf. Greek patḗr, Sanskrit pitṛ́, English father)
PIE *dh₃-tós "given" > L datus (cf. Greek dotós, Sanskrit ditá-)

A sequence of syllabic resonant + laryngeal, when before a consonant, produced mā, nā, rā, lā (as also in Celtic, cf. Greek nē/nā/nō, rē/rā/rō, etc. depending on the laryngeal; Germanic um, un, ur, ul; Sanskrit ā, ā, īr/ūr, īr/ūr; Lithuanian ím, ín, ír, íl):
 PIE  "born" > gnātus "son", nātus "born" (participle) (cf. Middle Welsh gnawt "relative", Greek dió-gnētos "Zeus' offspring", Sanskrit jātá-, English kind, kin)
 PIE  "grain" > grānum (cf. Old Irish grán, English corn, Lithuanian žìrnis "pea", jīrṇá- "old, worn out")
 PIE  "wool" > *wlānā > lāna (cf. Welsh gwlân, Gothic wulla, Greek lēnos, Lithuanian vìlna, Sanskrit ū́rṇa-)

Consonants

Aspirates
The Indo-European voiced aspirates bʰ, dʰ, gʰ, gʷʰ, which were probably breathy voiced stops, first devoiced in initial position (fortition), then fricatized in all positions, producing pairs of voiceless/voiced fricatives in Proto-Italic: f ~ β,  ~ ð,  ~ ,  ~  respectively. The fricatives were voiceless in initial position. However, between vowels and other voiced sounds, there are indications—in particular, their evolution in Latin—that the sounds were actually voiced. Likewise, Proto-Italic /s/ apparently had a voiced allophone [z] in the same position.

In all Italic languages, the word-initial voiceless fricatives f, θ, and χʷ all merged to f, whereas χ debuccalized to h (except before a liquid where it became g); thus, in Latin, the normal outcome of initial PIE bʰ, dʰ, gʰ, gʷʰ is f, f, h, f, respectively. Examples:
PIE *bʰér-e- "carry" > ferō (cf. Old Irish beirid "bears", English bear, Sanskrit bhárati)
PIE *bʰréh₂tēr "brother" > *bʰrā́tēr > frāter (cf. Old Irish bráthair, Sanskrit bhrā́tar-, Greek phrā́tēr "member of a phratry")
PIE *dʰeh₁- "put, place" > *dʰh₁-k- > *θaki- > faciō "do, make" (cf. Welsh dodi, English do, Greek títhēmi "I put", Sanskrit dádhāti he puts")
PIE *dʰwṓr "door" > θwor- > *forā > forēs (pl.) "door(s)" (cf. Welsh dôr, Greek thurā, Sanskrit dvā́ra- (pl.))
PIE *gʰabʰ- "seize, take" > *χaβ-ē- > habeō "have" (cf. Old Irish gaibid "takes", Old English gifan "to give", Polish gabać "to seize")
PIE *ǵʰaidos "goat" > *χaidos > haedus "kid" (cf. Old English gāt "goat", Polish zając "hare", Sanskrit háyas "horse")
PIE *ǵʰh₂ens "goose" > *χans- > (h)ānser (cf. Old Irish géiss "swan", German Gans, Greek khḗn, Sanskrit haṃsá-)
PIE *gʰlh₂dʰ-rós "shining, smooth" > *χlaðros > *glabrus > glaber "smooth" (cf. Polish gładki "smooth", Old English glæd "bright, glad")
PIE *gʷʰen-dʰ- "to strike, kill" > *χʷ(e)nð- > fendō (cf. Welsh gwanu "to stab", Old High German gundo "battle", Sanskrit hánti "(he) strikes, kills", -ghna "killer (used in compounds)" )
PIE *gʷʰerm- "warm" > *χʷormo- > formus (cf. Old Prussian gorme "heat", Greek thermós, Sanskrit gharmá- "heat")

Word-internal *-bʰ-, *-dʰ-, *-gʰ-, *-gʷʰ- evolved into Proto-Italic β, ð, ɣ, ɣʷ. In Osco-Umbrian, the same type of merger occurred as that affecting voiceless fricatives, with β, ð, and ɣʷ merging to β. In Latin, this did not happen, and instead the fricatives defricatized, giving b, d ~ b, g ~ h, g ~ v ~ gu.*-bʰ- is the simplest case, consistently becoming b.
PIE *bʰébʰrus "beaver" > *feβro > Old Latin feber > fiber*-dʰ- usually becomes d, but becomes b next to r or u, or before l.
PIE *bʰeidʰ- "be persuaded" > *feiðe > fīdō "I trust" (cf. Old English bīdan "to wait", Greek peíthō "I trust")
PIE *medʰi-o- "middle" > *meðio- > medius (cf. Old Irish mide, Gothic midjis, Sanskrit mádhya-)
PIE *krei(H)-dʰrom "sieve, sifter" > *kreiðrom > crībrum "sieve" (cf. Old English hrīder "sieve")
PIE *h₁rudʰ-ró- "red" > *ruðro- > ruber (cf. Old Russian rodrŭ, Greek eruthrós, Sanskrit rudhirá-)
PIE *sth̥₂-dʰlom > *staðlom > stabulum "abode" (cf. German Stadel)
PIE *werh₁-dʰh₁-o- "word" > *werðo- > verbum (cf. English word, Lithuanian var̃das)

The development of *-gʰ- is twofold: *-gʰ- becomes h [ɦ] between vowels but g elsewhere:
PIE *weǵʰ- "carry" > *weɣ-e/o > vehō (cf. Greek okhéomai "I ride", Old English wegan "to carry", Sanskrit váhati "(he) drives")
PIE *dʰi-n-ǵʰ- "shapes, forms" > *θinɣ-e/o > fingō (cf. Old Irish -ding "erects, builds", Gothic digan "to mold, shape")*-gʷʰ- has three outcomes, becoming gu after n, v between vowels, and g next to other consonants. All three variants are visible in the same root *snigʷʰ- "snow" (cf. Irish snigid "snows", Greek nípha):
PIE *snei-gʷʰ-e/o > *sninɣʷ-e/o (with n-infix) > ninguit "it snows"
PIE *snigʷʰ-ós > *sniɣʷos > gen. sg. nivis "of snow"
PIE *snigʷʰ-s > *sniɣʷs > nom. sg. nix (i.e. /nig-s/) "snow"
Other examples:
PIE *h₁le(n)gʷʰu- > *h₁legʷʰu- > *leɣʷus > *leɣʷis (remade as i-stem) > levis "lightweight" (cf. Welsh llaw "small, low", Greek elakhús "small", Sanskrit laghú-, raghú- "quick, light, small")

Labiovelars*gʷ has results much like non-initial *-gʷʰ, becoming v /w/ in most circumstances, but gu after a nasal and g next to other consonants:
PIE *gʷih₃wos > *ɣʷīwos > vīvus "alive" (cf. Old Irish biu, beo, Lithuanian gývas, Sanskrit jīvá- "alive")
PIE *gʷm̥i̯e/o- "come" > *ɣʷen-je/o > veniō (cf. English come, Greek baínō "I go", Avestan ǰamaiti "he goes", Sanskrit gam- "go")
PIE *gʷr̥h₂us "heavy" > *ɣʷraus > grāvis (cf. Greek barús, Gothic kaúrus, Sanskrit gurú-)
PIE *h₃engʷ- > *onɣʷ-en > unguen "salve" (cf. Old Irish imb "butter", Old High German ancho "butter", Sanskrit añjana- "anointing, ointment")
PIE *n̥gʷén- "(swollen) gland" > *enɣʷen > inguen "bubo; groin" (cf. Greek adḗn gen. adénos "gland", Old High German ankweiz "pustules")*kʷ remains as qu before a vowel, but reduces to c /k/ before a consonant or next to a u:
PIE *kʷetwóres, neut. *kʷetwṓr "four" > quattuor (cf. Old Irish cethair, Lithuanian keturì, Sanskrit catvā́r-)
PIE *leikʷ- (pres. *li-né-kʷ-) "leave behind" > *linkʷ-e/o- : *likʷ-ē- > linquō "leaves" : liceō "is allowed; is for sale" (cf. Greek leípō, limpánō, Sanskrit riṇákti, Gothic  "to lend")
PIE *nokʷts "night" > nox, gen. sg. noctisPIE *sekʷ- "to follow" > sequor (cf. Old Irish sechem, Greek hépomai, Sanskrit sácate)

The sequence *p  *kʷ assimilates to *kʷ  *kʷ, an innovation shared with Celtic:
PIE *pekʷō "I cook" > *kʷekʷō > coquō (cf. coquīna, cocīnā "kitchen" vs. popīna "tavern" < Oscan, where *kʷ > p, Polish piekę "I bake", Sanskrit pacati "cooks")
PIE *pénkʷe "five" > quīnque (cf. Old Irish cóic, Greek pénte, Sanskrit páñca-)
PIE *pérkʷus "oak" > quercus (cf. Trentino porca "fir", Punjabi pargāī "holm oak", Gothic  "world", faírgun- "mountain")

The sequences *ḱw, *ǵw, *ǵʰw develop identically to *kʷ, *gʷ, *gʷʰ:
PIE *dn̥ǵʰwéh₂ "tongue" > *dn̥ɣwā > *denɣʷā > Old Latin dingua > linguaPIE *éḱwos "horse" > *ekʷos > Old Latin equos > ecus > equus (assimilated from other forms, e.g. gen. sg. equī; cf. Sanskrit aśva-, which indicates -ḱw- not -kʷ-)
PIE *ǵʰweh₁ro- "wild animal" > *χʷero- > ferus (cf. Greek thḗr, Lesbian phḗr, Lithuanian žvėrìs)
PIE *mreǵʰus "short" > *mreɣu- > *mreɣʷi- (remade as i-stem) > brevis (cf. Old English myrge "briefly", English merry, Greek brakhús, Avestan mǝrǝzu-, Sanskrit múhu "suddenly")

Other sequences
Initial *dw- (attested in Old Latin as du-) becomes b-, thus compensating for the dearth of words beginning with *b in PIE:
PIE *deu-l̥- "injure" > duellom "war" > bellum (a variant duellum survived in poetry as a trisyllabic word, whence English "duel")
PIE *dwis "twice" > duis > bis (cf. Greek dís, Sanskrit dvis)

S-rhotacism
Indo-European s between vowels was first voiced to [z] in late Proto-Italic and became r in Latin and Umbrian, a change known as rhotacism. Early Old Latin documents still have s [z], and Cicero once remarked that a certain Papirius Crassus officially changed his name from Papisius in 339 .., indicating the approximate time of this change. This produces many alternations in Latin declension:est "he is", fut. erit "he will be"flōs "flower", gen. flōrismūs "mouse", pl. mūrēsOther examples:
 Proto-Italic *a(j)os, a(j)esem > *aes, aezem > aes, aerem "bronze", but PI *a(j)es-inos > *aeznos > aēnus "bronze (adj.)"
 Proto-Italic *ausōs, ausōsem > *auzōs, auzōzem > aurōra "dawn" (change of suffix; cf. English east, Aeolic Greek aúōs, Sanskrit uṣā́s)
 Proto-Italic *swesōr > *swozōr > soror "sister" (cf. Old English sweostor, Sanskrit svásar)

However, before another r, dissimilation occurred with sr [zr] becoming br (likely via an intermediate *ðr):
 Proto-Italic *keras-rom > *kerazrom ~ *keraðrom > cerebrum "skull, brain" (cf. Greek kéras "horn")
 Proto-Italic *swesr-īnos > *swezrīnos ~ *sweðrīnos > sobrīnus "maternal cousin"

See alsoDe vulgari eloquentia''
Legacy of the Roman Empire

Notes

References

Sources

External links
  Latin Etymology, An Etymological Dictionary of the Latin Language

Latin language
Italic language histories
Sound laws